State Route 203 (SR 203) is a  route that serves as a bypass around the northern and western portions of the town of Elba in Coffee County.

Route description
The southern terminus of SR 203 is located at its intersection with SR 189 south of central Elba. From this point, the route travels in a northwesterly direction en route to US 84. From this point it begins its gradual loop in a northeasterly direction before reaching its northern terminus at its junction with SR 125 northeast of central Elba.

Major intersections

References

203
Transportation in Coffee County, Alabama